Frida Erika Appelgren, earlier married Muranius, born 5 April 1981 in Malmö, Sweden, is a Swedish music artist scoring a mid-2007 hit with the song Dunka mig gul och blå.

Together with Headline she participated at Melodifestivalen 2008 with the song Upp o hoppa, which ended up 10th in the finals.

Discography
Gasen I Botten (rap. Mange; Magnus Rytterstam)
Hoppa upp
2007 – Dunka mig gul och blå
2008 – Upp och hoppa
2014 – Hit and Run

References

External links

1981 births
Living people
Singers from Malmö
Extensive Music artists
21st-century Swedish singers
21st-century Swedish women singers
Melodifestivalen contestants of 2008